RightsFlow is an American company that provides organizations, bands, songwriters and individuals with music licensing services and royalty payment solutions. It was founded in 2007.

RightsFlow is based in New York City. It was co-founded by Patrick Sullivan and Benjamin Cockerham, who are still with the company. Sullivan is currently the president & CEO, and Cockerham is currently the CFO and chief strategy officer.  Additional members of the executive team include Matt Irvin, senior vice president of product and co-founder, Scott Sellwood, senior vice-president and general counsel, Fred Beteille, senior vice-president, operations and technology, Michael Kauffman, senior vice-president of corporate communications and content, Chris Lydle, vice-president of sales and marketing, and Alex Holz, vice-president of artist and client relations.

The company was acquired by Google on December 9, 2011, with the deal announced on the YouTube blog.

Brief history
Launched in 2007, RightsFlow now has over 16,000 clients, including YouTube, Muzak, Wolfgang's Vault, and Rhapsody, as well as CDBaby, Disc Makers, We Print Discs and Zynga. RightsFlow was selected No. 8 on Crain's New York "Best Places To Work in NYC" for 2011. The company was acquired by Google in December 2011 and is now a subsidiary of YouTube.

Services
Rightsflow provides online music services, record companies, distributors and artists the ability to license music and lyrics while also managing payments for the rights holders. Through their LimeLight service, RightsFlow helps secure the mechanical license for individuals, artists and bands. Through their MySpark service, the company simplifies copyright registration with the United States Copyright Office.

Limelight is an online rights clearance service to secure a mechanical license, or the right to record a cover version of a song. Limelight charges a small fee to attempt to secure the license.

MySpark is an online utility that simplifies copyright registration for creators and owners of various forms of intellectual property including literary works, visual arts, sound recordings, performing arts, and software.

References

External links
 

Music organizations based in the United States
Companies based in New York City
Music publishing
Google acquisitions
Music licensing organizations